National Cathedral School (NCS) is an independent Episcopal private day school for girls in grades 4–12 located on the grounds of the Washington National Cathedral in Washington, D.C., United States. Founded by philanthropist and suffragist Phoebe Apperson Hearst and Bishop Henry Yates Satterlee in 1900, NCS is the oldest of the institutions constituting the Protestant Episcopal Cathedral Foundation.

About

NCS has about 580 students in grades 4 through 12. Its mascot is the eagle. Its brother school, St. Albans, and the shared coeducational elementary school (K–3), Beauvoir, are also located on the  Cathedral Close in Northwest Washington near the Washington National Cathedral. Elinor Scully is the twelfth Head of School.

Notable alumnae

 Bella Alarie 2016, current WNBA player with the Dallas Wings
 Ashton Applewhite '70. best-selling author, journalist, ageism expert and advocate
 Judith Barcroft, actress, All My Children and other soap operas
 Sydney Barta 2022, 2020 US Paralympian Track and Field
 Esther Brimmer, foreign policy expert and past Assistant Secretary of State for International Organization Affairs
 Beverly Byron '50, U.S. Congresswoman (D-Md.), 1978–1993
 Amanda Cassatt '09, journalist and entrepreneur
 Liz Clarke, sportswriter
 Kate Collins, actress
 Ethel Roosevelt Derby, civil rights spokesperson
 Karen C. Fox, science writer
 Kristin Gore '95, author and Emmy-nominated screenwriter 
 Karenna Gore Schiff '91, author, journalist, and attorney
 Libby Fischer Hellmann, mystery writer
 Alice Hill '74, policy maker and academic
 Katharine Holmes, Olympic fencer at the 2016 Summer Olympics
 Alice S. Huang, biologist, former president of AAAS
 Naomi Iizuka, Japanese-American playwright, professor at UCSB
 Luci Baines Johnson, '65, daughter of U.S. President Lyndon Baines Johnson
 Lynda Bird Johnson Robb, '62, daughter of U.S. President Lyndon Baines Johnson
 Kate Kelly '93, journalist and author 
 Kara Kennedy, filmmaker and television producer
Heather Langenkamp, actress, A Nightmare on Elm Street
 Jenny Lin, Taiwanese-American pianist
 Maya MacGuineas, political writer and President of the Committee for a Responsible Federal Budget
 Leslie Marshall, journalist and novelist
 Petra Mayer '94, journalist and book reviewer
 Caroline Adams Miller, coach, speaker, and author
 Queen Noor of Jordan, née Lisa Halaby, writer, activist
 Michelle Nunn, non-profit executive; former political candidate 
 Cristina Odone, Italian journalist, editor, writer
 Alexandra Petri, op-ed columnist and writer of the ComPost Blog at the Washington Post 
 Brenda Putnam, sculptor
 Stephanie Ready, professional and college basketball broadcaster; first woman to coach US men's professional basketball
 Helene Reynolds, actress in the 1940s
 Susan E. Rice, National Security Advisor; former United States Ambassador to the United Nations; former foreign policy advisor to Democratic Presidential candidate U.S. Sen. Barack Obama (D.-IL); former Assistant Secretary of State for African Affairs 
 Ruth Starr Rose, painter 
 Sandra Scarr, former chair of the psychology department at University of Virginia
 Trish Sie, music video, commercial, and feature film director (Pitch Perfect 3)
 Mary Elizabeth Taylor, former Assistant Secretary of State for Legislative Affairs Caroline Thompson, screenwriter, Edward Scissorhands''
 Elizabeth Walton Vercoe, musician, educator, and composer 
 Robin Witt, theater director

Notable former faculty
Gladys Milligan, art instructor
Lola Sleeth Miller, art instructor

References

External links
 
 Washington National Cathedral
 Protestant Episcopal Cathedral Foundation
 Association of Independent Schools of Greater Washington

Independent School League
Private high schools in Washington, D.C.
Girls' schools in Washington, D.C.
Educational institutions established in 1900
Washington National Cathedral
Episcopal schools in the United States
Private elementary schools in Washington, D.C.
Private middle schools in Washington, D.C.
Preparatory schools in Washington, D.C.

1900 establishments in Washington, D.C.